Schwerte station is a through station in the town of Schwerte in the German state of North Rhine-Westphalia. The station was opened with the section of the Hagen–Hamm railway between Hagen and Holzwickede, opened by the Bergisch-Märkische Railway Company (BME) on 1 April 1867. It has six platform tracks and it is classified by Deutsche Bahn as a category 4 station.

The station is served by the Rhein-Münsterland-Express (RE 7) between Krefeld and Rheine, the Maas-Wupper-Express (RE 13) between Venlo and Hamm, the Sauerland-Express (RE 17) between Hagen and Warburg or Kassel-Wilhelmshöhe and the Ardey-Bahn (RB 53) between Dortmund and Iserlohn, each hourly.

Notes

Railway stations in North Rhine-Westphalia
Railway stations in Germany opened in 1867
1867 establishments in Prussia